Stomachic is a historic term for a medicine that serves to tone the stomach, improving its function and increase appetite.  While many herbal remedies claim stomachic effects, modern pharmacology does not have an equivalent term for this type of action.

Herbs with putative stomachic effects include:
 Agrimony
 Aloe
 Anise
 Avens (Geum urbanum)
 Barberry
 Bitterwood (Picrasmaa excelsa)
 Cannabis
 Cayenne
 Centaurium
 Cleome
 Colombo (herb) (Frasera carolinensis)
 Dandelion
 Elecampane
 Ginseng
 Goldenseal
 Grewia asiatica (Phalsa or Falsa)
 Hops
 Holy thistle
 Juniper berry
 Mint
 Mugwort
 Oregano
 Peach bark
 Rhubarb
 White mustard seeds
 Rose hips
 Rue
 Sweet flag (Acorus calamus)
 Wormwood (Artemisia absinthium)

The purported stomachic mechanism of action of these substances is to stimulate the appetite by increasing the gastric secretions of the stomach; however, the actual therapeutic value of some of these compounds is dubious.  Some other important agents used are:
 Bitters: used to stimulate the taste buds, thus producing reflex secretion of gastric juices.  Quassia, Aristolochia, gentian, and chirata are commonly used.
 Alcohol: increases gastric secretion by direct action and also by the reflex stimulation of taste buds.
 Miscellaneous compounds: including insulin which increases the gastric secretion by producing hypoglycemia, and histamine, which produces direct stimulation of gastric glands.

References

Gastroenterology
Herbalism
Pharmacognosy